Olivia is a fictional pig character in a series of children's picture books written and illustrated by Ian Falconer, the first entry of which was published in 2000. An American-British-Irish computer animated television series of the same name inspired by the character premiered in 2009.

Development
The Olivia book series was inspired by Ian Falconer's niece, Olivia. "I was just entranced by her," he stated. "I wanted to make a little present for her, so I started working on the Olivia book."

The series is different from many children's picture books because of its stark minimalism. Inspired by the style of Dr. Seuss, Falconer chose to draw uncluttered images in black and white with the occasional splash of red, along with the insertion of real artwork by famous artists — Degas and Pollock, for example. Each book in the series explores the use of another signature color in addition to the original black, white and red images.

Olivia books have been translated into many languages including Czech, French, German, Spanish, Portuguese, Italian, Dutch, Chinese, Japanese, Danish, Swedish, Finnish, Russian, Hebrew and Latin.

Books

Written by Falconer
 Olivia (2000) – a 2001 Caldecott Honor book, listed as one of the "Teachers' Top 100 Books for Children" by the National Education Association in 2007, listed in the "Top 100 Picture Books" of all time in a 2012 poll by School Library Journal       
 Olivia Saves the Circus (2001) – the 2002 Booksense Illustrated Children's Book of the Year
 Olivia's Opposites (2002) – a board book
 Olivia Counts (2002) – a board book
 Olivia...and the Missing Toy (2003)
 Teatro Olivia (2004) – a fold-out theater with paper dolls
 Olivia Forms a Band (2006) – winner of 2006 Child Magazine's Best Children's Book Award
 Olivia Helps with Christmas (2007) – Falconer won the 2008 Illustrator of the Year in the Children's Choice Book Awards for this title
 Olivia Goes to Venice (2010)
 Olivia and the Fairy Princesses (2012)
 Olivia the Spy (2017)

Tie-ins to the Nickelodeon TV show (not written by Falconer)
Olivia Acts Out (2009) – hardcover
Dinner with Olivia (2009) – paperback
Olivia Trains Her Cat (2009) – paperback (a Ready-To-Read book)
Olivia Leaps! (2009) – board book
This is Olivia (2009) – hardcover (a fold-out book)
Olivia the Magnificent: A Life-the-Flap Story (2009) – paperback
Meet Olivia (2009) – a coloring and activity book
Brava Olivia (2009) – a coloring and activity book with stickers
Olivia and Her Ducklings (2010) – paperback (a Ready-To-Read book)
Olivia and the Babies (2010) – paperback
Olivia Takes a Trip (2010) – paperback (a Ready-To-Read book)
Olivia Opens a Lemonade Stand (2010) – paperback
Olivia and the School Carnival (2010) – paperback
Olivia and the Snowy Day (2010) – hardcover (a Ready-To-Read book)
Olivia Cooks Up a Surprise (2011) – hardcover
Olivia Plants a Garden (2011) – hardcover (a Ready-To-Read book)
Olivia Leads a Parade (2011) – paperback
Olivia Goes Camping (2011) – hardcover (a Ready-To-Read book)
Olivia Becomes a Vet (2011) – hardcover (a Ready-To-Read book)
Olivia and the Rain Dance (2012) – hardcover (a Ready-To-Read book)
Olivia and the Kite Party (2012) – hardcover (a Ready-To-Read book)

Awards
Caldecott Honor for Olivia, 2000
Parent's Choice 2000, Gold Award Winner
Nick Jr. Best Book of 2001
ALA Notable Children's Books 2000 & 2001
Child's Best Book of 2001
Los Angeles Times Best Books of 2000 & 2001
Publishers Weekly, Best Books of 2000 & 2001
BookSense Illustrated Children's Book of the Year for Olivia Saves the Circus, 2002
Voted "Favorite Illustrator" for Olivia Helps with Christmas by over 50,000 children at the Children's Choice Book Awards, 2008

In other adaptations
 In 2006, Olivia was one of eight characters to be featured by the United States Postal Service on first-class stamps as part of the "Favorite Children's Book Animals" issue.
 In 2005, Olivia made her first television appearance as a doll (voiced by Emily Gray) who is the co-host of the live-action comedy television series, The Olivia Squared TV Show hosted by Ricki Lake as Tiffany Lewis.
 In 2008, Nickelodeon partnered with children's media company, Chorion, to bring the bestselling Simon & Schuster Olivia books to life in a new animated television series. The new 3D CGI series was produced by Academy Award nominated animation studio Brown Bag Films and launched on Nickelodeon on January 26, 2009.
In 2011, Polin8 Media partnered with children's media company, Chorion, to create an interactive iPad application "Olivia Acts Out" available on the iTunes Store.

See also 

 Olivia (TV series)
 List of Olivia episodes

References

External links
Olivia on Nick Jr.
Chorion
Brown Bag Films
 
Simon & Schuster- Ian Falconer Author Profile
Polin8 Media

Olivia (TV series)
Fictional pigs
DreamWorks Classics
Literary characters introduced in 2000
Pigs in literature
Series of children's books